is a Japanese professional footballer who plays as a winger for Shimizu S-Pulse.

References

External links

1996 births
Living people
Japanese footballers
Association football midfielders
Yokohama FC players
Shimizu S-Pulse players
J1 League players
J2 League players